This is a List Of The Tallest Buildings In Madrid. Since 2009, the tallest building in Madrid (and Spain) has been Torre de Cristal, that dominates the Madrid skyline with 250 m in height. Madrid has two main business centres: Cuatro Torres Business Area and AZCA.

Tallest buildings
The list includes buildings (above ) in the city of Madrid and its metropolitan area. An asterisk (*) indicates that the building is still under construction, but has been topped out.

Tallest under construction or proposed

Under construction

Proposed

Timeline of tallest buildings

Gallery

Sources and external links

 Report for Madrid at Emporis
 Report for Madrid at SkyscraperPage
 Report for Madrid at Structurae

References

Madrid

Tallest buildings